The 2019–20 Miami hurricanes women's basketball team represented the University of Miami during the 2019–20 NCAA Division I women's basketball season. The Hurricanes, led by fifteenth-year head coach Katie Meier, played their home games at the Watsco Center and were members of the Atlantic Coast Conference.

The Hurricanes finished the season 15–15 and 7–11 in ACC play to finish in a tie for eleventh place.  As the eleventh seed in the ACC tournament, they lost to Clemson in the First Round.  The NCAA tournament and WNIT were cancelled due to the COVID-19 outbreak.

Previous season

For the 2018–19 season, the Hurricanes finished 25–9 overall and 10–6, tied for third in the ACC.  Miami was eliminated in the quarterfinals of the ACC tournament by Florida State. The Hurricanes received an at-large bid to the NCAA tournament as a four-seed, their fifth consecutive tournament appearance.  They defeated Florida Gulf Coast in the first round before losing to Arizona State in the second round.

Off-season

Recruiting Class

Source:

Roster

Schedule

Source

|-
!colspan=9 style="background:#005030; color:#F47321;"| Exhibition

|-
!colspan=9 style="background:#005030; color:#F47321;"| Non-conference regular season

|-
!colspan=9 style="background:#005030; color:#F47321;"| ACC regular season

|-
!colspan=9 style="background:#005030; color:#F47321;"| ACC Women's Tournament

Rankings

The Coaches Poll releases a final poll after the NCAA tournament, but the AP Poll does not release a poll at this time.

References

Miami Hurricanes women's basketball seasons
Miami